Filippo Castaldi (circa 1710 – 1785) was an Italian portrait painter of the late-Baroque period, active mainly in Southern Italy and Poland.

Life
He was born in Arpino, trained in Rome, but became a painter to the Royal court of Poland.

References

1710 births
1782 deaths
People from Arpino
18th-century Italian painters
Italian male painters
Italian Baroque painters
Polish painters
Polish male painters
18th-century Italian male artists